Zelosyne is a genus of moths in the family Gelechiidae.

Species
 Zelosyne olga Meyrick, 1915
 Zelosyne poecilosoma Walsingham, 1911

References

Gelechiinae